Henry N. Lewis is an American former Negro league outfielder and manager who played in the 1940s.

Lewis played for the Atlanta Black Crackers in 1943, and also managed the team that season. In three recorded games as a player, he posted two hits in 11 plate appearances.

References

External links
Baseball statistics and player information from Baseball-Reference Black Baseball Stats and Seamheads

Year of birth missing
Place of birth missing
Atlanta Black Crackers players